Kelly Johnson may refer to:
Kelly Johnson (engineer) (1910–1990), American aeronautical engineer
Kelly Johnson (baseball) (born 1982), American baseball player
Kelly Johnson (figure skater) (born 1961), Canadian ice dancer
Kelly Johnson (guitarist) (1958–2007), English lead guitarist with rock band Girlschool
John Kelly Johnson (1841–1894), American politician and judge

See also
Kelley Johnson (born 1992), Miss Colorado 2015
Kelley Johnson (footballer) (born 1992), Puerto Rican footballer
Kelly D. Johnston (born 1956), Secretary of the U.S. Senate